Gotthilf Heinrich von Schubert (26 April 1780, in Hohenstein-Ernstthal – 30 June 1860, in Laufzorn, a village in Oberhaching) was a German physician and naturalist.

Biography
He began his studies with theology, but turned to medicine and established himself as a doctor in Altenburg, Saxe-Gotha-Altenburg. He soon gave up his practice however and devoted himself to research in Dresden (from 1806). In 1809, by way of mediation from Friedrich Wilhelm Joseph Schelling, he received the post of rector at a secondary school in Nuremberg.

He gave renowned lectures on fringe science (animal magnetism, clairvoyance and dream), and in 1819 he occupied the chair in natural history in Erlangen where he studied botany (botanical abbreviation: Schub.), forestry, mineralogy and geognosy. In 1827 he moved for the last time, to Munich, where he was appointed professor; it was here that the highly popular and friendly Schubert found an embittered opponent in Lorenz Oken.

Schubert aimed to create a religiously-grounded interpretation of the cosmos. Contemporaries that included Johann Wolfgang von Goethe, Jean Paul, Justinus Kerner and Heinrich von Kleist were favorable to his work. His masterpiece, Symbolism of Dreams (1814) was one of the most famous books of its time, exercising influence over E. T. A. Hoffmann, and later on, Sigmund Freud and C. G. Jung. Schubert advocated an ecumenical "awakened Christianity" which found evidence for God both in Nature and in the human soul. Synthesising the Bible with the philosophy of Schelling, he was a major figure in the "later Enlightenment". In his History of the Soul (1830), Schubert again attempted to fuse the philosophy of Herder and Schelling with the Christian tradition.

In 1824 Carl Friedrich Philipp von Martius named the plant genus Schubertia (family Apocynaceae) in his honor.

Selected works 
 Die Kirche und die Götter. Roman. 2 volumes. 1804 – The church and the gods.
 Ansichten von der Nachtseite der Naturwissenschaft. Arnold, Dresden 1808 – Views from the dark side of science.
 Handbuch der Naturkunde. 2 volumes. Schrag, Nürnberg 1813 (Vol 1: Handbuch der Mineralogie, Vol 2: Handbuch der Geognosie und der Bergkunde) – Handbook of natural history.
 Die Symbolik des Traumes. Kunz, Bamberg 1814 – Symbolism of dreams.
 Altes und Neues aus dem Gebiet der innren Seelenkunde, 5 volumes 1817-44 – Old and new in the field of inner psychology.
 Reise durch das südliche Frankreich und Italien. 2 volumes Palm and Enke, Erlangen 1827-1831 – Journey through southern France and Italy.
 Die Geschichte der Seele, 2 volumes. Cotta, Stuttgart 1830; – History of the soul.
 Biographieen und Erzählungen. 4 volumes in 3 tomes. Heyder, Erlangen 1847–1848 – Biographies and stories.
 Der Erwerb aus einem vergangenen und die Erwartungen von einem zukünftigen Leben. Eine Selbstbiographie. 5 volumes. Palm und Enke, Erlangen 1854–1856 – The acquisition of a past and the expectations of a future life. An autobiography.
 Naturgeschichte des Tier-, Pflanzen- und Mineralreichs. Schreiber, Esslingen und München (8th edition, 1886) – Natural history of the animal, vegetable and mineral kingdom.

Sources

External links
BHLKirby, W. F, 1889. 'Natural history of the animal kingdom for the use of young people : in three parts, comprising I. Mammalia : II. Birds : Part III. Reptiles, amphibia, fishes, insects, worms, molluscs, zoophytes, &c. : with 91 coloured plates, including about 850 figures, and numerous adapted from the German of Professor von Schubert by W.F. Kirby.Brighton, E. & J.B. Young and Co.
 Dieter Woelfel: Schubert, Gotthilf Heinrich In:. Biographic-bibliographic church encyclopedia (BBKL). Volume 9, Bautz, Herzberg 1995 , Sp. 1030-1040.

1780 births
1860 deaths
People from Hohenstein-Ernstthal
19th-century German physicians
Physicians from Saxony
German naturalists
German philosophers
Academic staff of the University of Erlangen-Nuremberg
Academic staff of the Ludwig Maximilian University of Munich
People from Munich (district)
German male writers